The 2001 Kroger Supermarkets 300 was a NASCAR Winston Cup race held at New Hampshire Motor Speedway. The race was originally scheduled for September 16 but was postponed to November 23 due to the September 11 attacks of that year. New Hampshire was the season finale as a result.

This was the last NASCAR race in the top division without Jimmie Johnson until the 2020 Brickyard 400 when Johnson tested positive for COVID-19.

Summary
NASCAR did not want to cancel the event, but there were no scheduled off weeks from the September 16 date. This left NASCAR with only one option: Thanksgiving weekend. The race was rescheduled for Friday, November 23 to allow for two potential weather reschedulings if necessary.

The postponement would be a challenge for Goodyear, as they were not expecting a race at the Magic Mile in November. As a result, Goodyear brought a tire they hoped would suit the cold conditions. NBC carried the broadcast live except for the Pacific Coast, which was on tape delay to allow the third hour of Today.

Qualifying
NASCAR did not conduct qualifying for the race. Instead, the points standings following the race at Richmond International Raceway the weekend before 9/11 were used to set the field. This put the 2001 series champion, Jeff Gordon, on the pole for the event, as he had been in the points lead at the time of the postponement, with Richmond winner Ricky Rudd alongside him on the front row as he had been second in the points standings at the time. Forty-one other drivers qualified for the race, with the final row filled by Petty Enterprises' Buckshot Jones and Kyle Petty. The forty-third spot would have gone to the entry fielded by Eel River Racing. However, after driver Rick Mast and sponsor Duke's Mayonnaise both left the team in October, the team folded operations. 

The race saw Robby Gordon, driving the No. 31 Chevrolet for Richard Childress Racing, pick up his first career win.

However, it was a controversial win, as he and Jeff Gordon, who had been up front all day, were facing each other, made contact with 16 laps to go.  This would put Robby in the lead during the final caution of the race. Jeff would retaliate under yellow and be black flagged. This did not affect Jeff's title hopes, as he had already clinched the title at Atlanta Motor Speedway the week before.

Top 10 finishers
 Robby Gordon (No. 31)
 Sterling Marlin (No. 40)
 Bobby Labonte (No. 18)
 Matt Kenseth (No. 17)
 Tony Stewart (No. 20)
 Jerry Nadeau (No. 25)
 Robert Pressley (No. 77)
 Brett Bodine (No. 11)
 Mark Martin (No. 6)
 Dale Jarrett (No. 88)

Timeline
Section reference: 
 Start of the race: Jeff Gordon started out with the pole position.
 Lap 2: Kevin Harvick took over the lead from Jeff Gordon.
 Lap 3: Jeff Gordon took over the lead from Kevin Harvick.
 Lap 32: Caution due to Michael Waltrip's accident, ended on lap 36.
 Lap 50: Sterling Marlin took over the lead from Jeff Gordon.
 Lap 51: First mandatory NASCAR competition caution, ended on lap 54.
 Lap 64: Jeff Gordon took over the lead from Sterling Marlin.
 Lap 97: Second mandatory NASCAR competition caution, ended on lap 104.
 Lap 129: Ward Burton ended up as the last-place finisher due to engine issues.
 Lap 138: Buckshot Jones had a terminal crash, ending his race weekend prematurely.
 Lap 142: Caution due to Buckshot Jones' accident, ended on lap 149.
 Lap 201: Caution due to John Andretti's accident, ended on lap 209.
 Lap 259: Bobby Labonte took over the lead from Jeff Gordon.
 Lap 268: Ricky Craven had a terminal crash, making him the final DNF of the race.
 Lap 273: Caution due to Ricky Craven's accident, ended on lap 278.
 Lap 274: Sterling Marlin took over the lead from Bobby Labonte.
 Lap 281: Robby Gordon took over the lead from Sterling Marlin.
 Lap 282: Jeff Gordon took over the lead from Robby Gordon.
 Lap 285: Robby Gordon took over the lead from Jeff Gordon.
 Lap 286: Caution due to Mike Wallace's accident, ended on lap 288.
 Finish: Robby Gordon was officially declared the winner of the event.

Standings after the race

References

New Hampshire 300
New Hampshire 300
NASCAR races at New Hampshire Motor Speedway